Selitë Mali is a village in the former municipality of Zall-Bastar in Tirana County, Albania. At the 2015 local government reform it became part of the municipality Tirana.

Demographic history
The village of Selita appears in the Ottoman defter of 1467 as a small village in the timar of Bahadır in the nahiyah of Benda. The village had a total of three households represented by the following household heads: Peter Skura, Margjin Tanushi, and Gjergj Sykuqi.

References

Populated places in Tirana
Villages in Tirana County